Politeia (Greek: πολιτεία) is an Ancient Greek word with no single English translation. 

Politeia may also refer to:

Publications
 Politeia (journal), a defunct South Africa academic journal
 Republic (Plato) (Greek: Politeia), a book by Plato

Other uses
 Politeia (think tank), centre-right British political think tank
 Politeia (moth), a genus of moths in the family Geometridae
 Politeia, Athens, a neighbourhood in the north of Athens, Greece

See also
 Politics (Aristotle) (Greek: Politiká), a book by Aristotle
 Politia (disambiguation)